This article is about the demographic features of the population of Solomon Islands, including population density, ethnicity, education level, health of the populace, economic status, religious affiliations and other aspects of the population.

The Solomon Islanders comprise diverse cultures, languages, and customs. Of its, 94.5% are Melanesian, 3% Polynesian, and 1.2% Micronesian. In addition, small numbers of Europeans and Chinese are registered. About 120 vernaculars are spoken.

Most people reside in small, widely dispersed settlements along the coasts. Sixty percent live in localities with fewer than 200 persons, and only 10% reside in urban areas.

The capital city of Honiara is situated on Guadalcanal, the largest island. The other principal towns are Gizo, Auki, and Kirakira.

Most Solomon Islanders are Christian, with the Anglican, Methodist, Roman Catholic, South Seas Evangelical, and Seventh-day Adventist faiths predominating. About 5% of the population maintain traditional beliefs.

The chief characteristics of the traditional Melanesian social structure are:
 The practice of subsistence economy;
 The recognition of bonds of kinship, with important obligations extending beyond the immediate family group;
 Generally egalitarian relationships, emphasising acquired rather than inherited status; and
 A strong attachment of the people to the land.

Most Solomon Islanders maintain this traditional social structure and find their roots in village life.

Vital statistics

Births and deaths

The World Factbook demographic statistics 

The following demographic statistics are from The World Factbook, unless otherwise indicated.

Population
 685,097

Age structure
 0–14 years: 32.99% (male 116,397/female 109,604)
 15–24 years: 19.82% (male 69,914/female 65,874)
 25–54 years: 37.64% (male 131,201/female 126,681)
 55–64 years: 5.04% (male 17,844/female 16,704)
 65 years and over: 4.51% (male 14,461/female 16,417) (2020 est.)

Population growth rate
 1.84%

Birth rate
 23.6 births/1,000 population

Death rate
 3.8 deaths/1,000 population

Net migration rate
 -1.6 migrant(s)/1,000 population

Urbanisation
 Urban Population: 24.7% of total population
 Rate of Urbanization: 3.91% annual rate of change

Sex ratio
 At Birth: 1.05 male(s)/female
 0–14 years: 1.06 male(s)/female
 15–24 years: 1.06 male(s)/female
 25–54 years: 1.04 male(s)/female
 55–64 years: 1.07 male(s)/female
 65 years and over: 0.88 male(s)/female
 Total Population: 1.04 male(s)/female (2020 est.)

Maternal mortality rate
 104 deaths/100,000 live births

Life expectancy at birth
 Total population: 76.2 years
 Male: 73.5 years
 Female: 79 years (2020 est.)

Total fertility rate
 2.97 children born/woman (2020 est.)

Health expenditure
 5.2% of GDP

Physicians density
 0.2 physicians/1,000 population

Hospital bed density
 1.4 beds/1,000 population

Nationality
 Solomon Islanders (noun)
 Solomon Islander (adjective)

Ethnic groups
 Melanesian 95.3%
 Polynesian 3.1%
 Micronesian 1.2%,
 Other 0.3%

Religions
 Protestant 73.4%
 Church of Melanesia 31.9%
 South Sea Evangelical 17.1%
 Seventh-day Adventist 11.7%
 United Church 10.1%
 Roman Catholic 19.6%
 Other Christian 2.9%
 Other 4%
 Unspecified 0.1%

Languages
 Melanesian Pidgin (lingua franca)
 English (official) (spoken by only 1–2% of the population)
 120 Indigenous Languages

Literacy
 Total population: 84.1%
 Male: 88.9%
 Female: 79.2%

References

Society of the Solomon Islands